The 1925 Georgia Normal Blue Tide football team represented Georgia Normal School—now known as Georgia Southern University– during the 1925 college football season. The team was coached by E. G. Cromartie, in his second season. The scores for the first three contests are unknown.

Schedule

References

Georgia Normal
Georgia Southern Eagles football seasons
Georgia Normal Blue Tide football